Porat is a mixed (religious and non-religious) moshav in central Israel. Located in the Sharon plain between Ein Vered and Kfar Yabetz, it falls under the jurisdiction of Lev HaSharon Regional Council.

History
Before the 20th century the area formed part of the Forest of Sharon. It was an open woodland dominated by Mount Tabor Oak, which extended from Kfar Yona in the north to Ra'anana in the south. The local Arab inhabitants traditionally used the area for pasture, firewood and intermittent cultivation. The intensification of settlement and agriculture in the coastal plain during the 19th century led to deforestation and subsequent environmental degradation.

The village was founded in 1950 on lands expropriated from residents of the Arab village of Qalansawe. Its name is taken from the Book of Genesis 49:22;
Joseph is a fruitful vine, a fruitful vine by a fountain; its branches run over the wall.

References

Moshavim
Religious Israeli communities
Populated places established in 1950
Populated places in Central District (Israel)
1950 establishments in Israel